Perth and Kinross Council is the local government council for the Perth and Kinross council area of Scotland. It employs around 6,000 people.

The council was created in 1996, under the Local Government etc. (Scotland) Act 1994, when the Tayside region was divided between three new unitary council areas: Perth and Kinross, Angus, and Dundee City.

The current Perth and Kinross council headquarters are located in Perth at 2 High Street, at Tay Street, although many public enquiries and council services are handled from the nearby Pullar House at 36 Mill Street, the former business premises of J. Pullar and Sons.

Elections 

General elections to the council are held on a four-year cycle. The most recent poll was held in 2022, on Thursday 5 May. The next local election will be held in 2027.

As a result of the Local Governance (Scotland) Act 2004 and the recommendations put forth by the Local Government Boundary Commission for Scotland, there are twelve wards within the Perth and Kinross council area. The 2007 general election was the first to use the single transferable vote system of election and multi-member wards, each ward electing three or four councillors. This system was introduced as a result of the Local Governance (Scotland) Act 2004, and is designed to produce a form of proportional representation.

Political composition 

The council is currently led by a minority SNP administration following from the 2022 Perth and Kinross Council election.

References

External links
Council website

 
Local authorities of Scotland
Organisations based in Perth and Kinross
Politics of Perth, Scotland